Georgia Campbell was a pitcher who played in the All-American Girls Professional Baseball League. Campbell batted and threw right handed. She was born in Syracuse, New York.

Campbell appears as a member of the Fort Wayne Daisies club during its 1946 season. She did not have individual records or some information was incomplete.

The AAGPBL folded in 1954, but there is a permanent display at the Baseball Hall of Fame and Museum at Cooperstown, New York since November 5, 1988, that honors the entire league rather than any individual figure.

Sources

All-American Girls Professional Baseball League players
Fort Wayne Daisies players
Baseball players from Syracuse, New York
Date of birth missing
Possibly living people
Year of birth missing